Pumpokol is one of the Yeniseian languages. It has been extinct since the 18th century. Along with Arin, it shares many features with the ancient Xiongnu and Jie languages, and according to Alexander Vovin, Edward Vajda, and Étienne de la Vaissière, is closely related to them.

Pumpokol is notable among the Yeniseian languages in that the phoneme /s/ is often substituted for /t/. This idiosyncrasy of Pumpokol seems to be shared with Jie, suggesting that Jie is more closely related to Pumpokol than other Yeniseian languages. For example the Jie word kot 'catch' seems to be a cognate with the Ket word 'qos', having the same sound change.

Moreover, this aforementioned characteristic of Pumpokol has been used by Vajda to demonstrate that Yeniseian-derived hydronyms in northern Mongolia (the southernmost known extent of Yeniseian influence) are exclusively Pumpokolic. Since the Jie, as a tribe of the Xiongnu, are likely to have come from the same area, rather than further north, this finding lends credence to the possibility that Jie is a Pumpokolic language.

Reference list

External links
 Pumpokol basic lexicon at the Global Lexicostatistical Database

Extinct languages of Asia
Yeniseian languages
Languages extinct in the 18th century